Vietnam Idol ( or  from season 5) is a Vietnamese reality television competition to find new solo singing talents. It is part of the Idol franchise; it originated from the reality program Pop Idol created by British entertainment executive Simon Fuller. Starting from season 8, the show is produced by Vietnam Television and Cát Tiên Sa.

History
Vietnam Idol was created based on the British show Pop Idol and U.S. show American Idol. Đông Tây Promotion and its sponsor partner Unilever secured the format license for US$2 million, which was the highest licensing fee paid for a reality TV show in Vietnam at the time. The show debuted in 2007 in Vietnam under the name Thần tượng âm nhạc: Vietnam Idol ("music idol: Vietnam idol"), broadcast by Ho Chi Minh City Television under the production of Đông Tây Promotion. Due to declined ratings in season two, the TV station and production company lost the license to produce a season to BHD Corp. and Vietnam Television. From season 5, the show was renamed to the pure Vietnamese title Thần tượng âm nhạc Việt Nam ("Vietnamese music idol") as per branding regulations of Vietnam's Ministry of Culture, Sports and Tourism.

In 2017, BHD announced that the production of Vietnam Idol was on hiatus in hopes of "finding new talents" amidst a rise of new reality singing shows in Vietnam and fierce competition against existing formats like The X Factor or The Voice.

In January 2023, it was announced that the show would make a return to VTV3 with Cát Tiên Sa as the new production company.

Series overview

Hosts and judges
In the first season, Vietnam Idol was co-hosted by Thanh Thảo and Nguyên Vũ. In the second season, Nguyên Vũ was replaced by Sỹ Luân. From season 3 onward, there was only one host per season. Phan Anh hosted the show in three non-consecutive seasons, the most out of all the hosts in the show's history.

Vietnam Idol maintained a 3-people panel across the series run except for season 3 when there were 4 judges. The panel usually consists of a singer, a producer and a composer. 

:In season 7, Phan Anh was the primary host throughout the season while Quốc Minh hosted the grand finale.

Season 1 (2007)

The first season of Vietnam Idol premiered on May 23, 2007, on HTV9. It was hosted by Thanh Thảo and Nguyên Vũ. The judges panel includes Siu Black, Tuấn Khanh and Hà Dũng. The grand finale was held on October 3, 2007, at Hòa Bình Theater with Phương Vy crowned the winner over Ngọc Ánh; Vy then sang her coronation song "Nụ cười và những ước mơ" (Smiles and Dreams) but did not release it as her single. Over 720,000 votes were counted for the finale and this was the only season to announce the number of votes. Phương Vy, Ngọc Ánh, Thảo Trang, Trà My, Duy Khánh released their solo albums afterwards and enjoyed moderate success after the show.

Season 2 (2008–09)

Following the success of season one, it was confirmed by the producers that Vietnam Idol had been renewed for a second season with auditions would take place in June. However, the authorities subsequently postponed the contest until late July, early August, stating that there were many similar contests on HTV from then to the year's end and the event was not suitable in the country's current social and economic situation. As a result, auditions commenced a month later than the original schedule. The season premiered on September 3 on HTV7. Sỹ Luân replaced Nguyên Vũ in season 1 to co-host the show with Thanh Thảo. The judges panel welcomed Hồ Hoài Anh and Trần Mạnh Tuấn as two new judges along with the original judge from season one - Siu Black.

At the Grand Finale, Quốc Thiên was announced the winner, taking the title over Thanh Duy. The coronation song for season one "Nụ cười và những ước mơ" was used again for this season.

Season 3 (2010)

After the show took a one-year break in 2009, it was renewed for a third season in 2010. The biggest change is the production team of the  Vietnam Television and BHD film studio took over the production of the series from previous producers HTV and Đông Tây Promotion. Siu Black returned as a judge while Nguyễn Quang Dũng, Quốc Trung and Đặng Diễm Quỳnh replaced Hồ Hoài Anh and Trần Mạnh Tuấn. Phan Anh took over as the season's sole host. While nearly 40,000 people signed up for the contest only 25,000 arrived to audition. This season followed the same structure as season 9 of American Idol, introducing "Save" option, inviting mentors for each round. The winner gets a recording contract with BHD Entertainment instead of Music Faces Records as in the previous seasons. The semi-final and final rounds were filmed at BHD Pictures Studio and the grand finale took place in Lan Anh Music Center.

At the Grand Finale, Uyên Linh was announced the winner, taking the title over Mai Hương. Linh then performed a new coronation song called "Cảm ơn tình yêu" (Thanks for Love) and released the song as her debut single a week later.

Uyên Linh and Văn Mai Hương achieved significant media attention after the season ended. Both Linh and Hương have reached number one on Vietnamese Favorite Song chart. Other alumni in season 3 also went on to enjoy notable mainstream success like Trung Quân and Bích Phương, who both have spawned many well-received hits since mid 2010s.

Season 4 (2012–13)

It was officially confirmed that the show would return for the fourth season. Siu Black ruled herself out of returning to judges' table only before the official press conference. On May 29, it was publicly unveiled the new judging panel, the new format and some changes. Mỹ Tâm replaced Siu Black, after her departure while Huy Khánh replaced Phan Anh as the host. Auditions started in June 2012. Broadcast commenced on Friday, August 17, 2012, at 8PM slot, replacing The Amazing Race Vietnam.

On February 1, 2013, the Grand Finale took place in Quân khu 7 Stadium. Ya Suy was crowned as the season winner over Hoàng Quyên. The season's coronation song was "Giây phút khát khao" (The Moment of Aspiration). After the season, Ya Suy's singing career was relatively inactive. He released his first single "Về với lúa" in late 2013 and proceeded to release two more singles in 2014 and 2017 before announcing his retirement from singing due to an issue with his vocals in April 2018.

Season 5 (2013–14)
Nguyễn Quang Dũng and Mỹ Tâm was confirmed to come back for the fifth season while Anh Quân was introduced as a new judge. Phan Anh returned as the host, replacing Huy Khánh from season 4. The season ran every Sunday from December 15, 2013, to May 11, 2014, at 8 pm. The season's top two were Trần Nhật Thủy and Trần Thị Thùy (stage name Minh Thùy). At the end of the finale, Phan Anh announced that Nhật Thủy received 52% of the vote, effectively becoming the winner of season 5.

Thủy released her first album entitled "Tỉnh giấc" (Awakening) in 2015. The album was a part of a project called Young Hit Young Beat, initiated by Vietnamese diva Mỹ Linh, former Vietnam Idol judge Anh Quân and Vietnam Idol's music director Huy Tuấn.

Season 6 (2015)
Two new judges of this season were Thanh Bui and Thu Minh; Thanh Bùi replaced Anh Quân and Thu Minh replaced Mỹ Tâm. Duy Hải became the new host. Broadcast commenced on Sunday, April 5, 2015, at 8PM.

On August 2, 2015, Nguyễn Trọng Hiếu, having received an overwhelming 71.5% of audience's vote, was named Vietnam Idol over runner-up Nguyễn Bích Ngọc. Trọng Hiếu, born in Germany and having been placed top 25 in season 5 of the German version, was the first foreign winner in the show's history. Hiếu's coronation song "Con đường tôi" (My way) was subsequently released as a single in both Vietnamese and German.

Season 7 (2016)
For season 7, Bằng Kiều replaced Thanh Bui on the judging panel while Phan Anh returned for his third season hosting the show. The season ran from May 27, 2016, to September 30, 2016, every Friday at 9.10 pm.

For the second season in a row, a foreigner was named Vietnam Idol as Janice Aranjuez Buco (stage name Janice Phương) from the Philippines received 54.25% of the votes, beating Phạm Việt Thắng's 45.75%. Janice released her coronation song "Love You in Silence", which contains lyrics in both English and Vietnamese language, as a single after the show.

Post-season, Janice released a new Vietnamese-language singled called "Tâm tư" (Feelings) in 2017. Janice cited language barriers as to why she had yet to make a breakthrough in Vietnamese music industry.

Season details

Controversies
The gameshow has come under intense criticism alleging voting irregularities and the lack of transparency in voting procedures.  Major newspapers such as Thanh Nien and Tuoi Tre ran stories about votes for a contestant being counted for another contestant though there was no hard evidence to prove the allegation and the organisers maintained that the results cannot be manipulated.  While the organizers maintain that allowing up to 500 votes per phone number and not publicly tallying votes are standard practices of all Idol shows, they have been accused of doing so to maximize profits at the expense of fairness. Furthermore, there were rumors about contestants' relationship with one of the judges and the PR manager of Vietnam Idol. A public auditor from the Singaporean auditing firm Paul Hooi & Co. was flown in to audit the vote counting process during the Grand Finale.

References

External links
List of television programmes broadcast by Vietnam Television (VTV)
List of television programmes broadcast by HTV
 

 
Television series by Fremantle (company)
2010s Vietnamese television series
2000s Vietnamese television series
Vietnamese television series based on British television series